Permanent way is the tracks, ballast, subgrade and lineside structure of a railway, see:

 Track (rail transport), description of contemporary permanent way structures and methods
 Permanent way (history), a history of permanent way in the UK

Other uses
 Permanent Way Institution
 The Permanent Way, a play by David Hare about the privatisation of Britain's railways
 "Permanent way" is an important road in the novel Absolution Gap by Alastair Reynolds